Gujar Khan (Pothwari Punjabi) is a city in Rawalpindi District, Punjab, Pakistan. It is also the headquarters of Gujar Khan Tehsil, the largest tehsil of Punjab by land area.

It is bounded on the north by Rawalpindi, Islamabad, and Attock, on the south by Jhelum, Lahore, and Gujrat, on the east by Azad Kashmir, and Kahuta and on the west by Chakwal and Khushab.

Located in the heart of the Potohar region, The city and surrounding region is renowned for their martial culture and is sometimes referred to as the 'Land of the Shaheed', having produced two recipients of the Nishan-i-Haider. There is the main district hospital in the center of the city, along with many other private and public medical and care services.

History 
The place was named due to the rule of Gujjar Prahihar clan which was ruling northern India during the sixth to tenth century. A large Gujjar settlement is still present in the Gujar Khan Tehsil.

Gujar Khan also contained a notable Hindu and Sikh population, though much of this population either converted to Islam during British rule, or migrated to India following partition. However the area is still home to Hindu temples and Sikh Gurdwaras which have been not maintained through the years.

Administration 

Gujar Khan is administratively subdivided into 36 union councils, whereas City Gujar Khan is administered by municipal corporation.

According to the 2017 census of Pakistan, the city had a population of 678,503.

Natural resources 
Large reserves of oil and gas were discovered in February 2002 at Tobra, about ten kilometres from Gujar Khan. The field is being developed by the Oil and Gas Development Company. The field could produce 1,600 barrels of crude oil daily.
Missa Kaswal and Ahdi is also a major source of energy in Gujar khan. Missa Kaswal is supplying several cubic meters of gas on a daily basis and is also extracting large quantities of oil.

Transport

Road 
Gujar Khan is located on the N5 National highway from Islamabad-Lahore. Railway Road links from the east of the city to the nearby towns of Bewal and Islampura. There are also many other minor roads linking the villages and towns of the region to the city.

Rail 
The Gujar Khan railway station is located in the center of the city and provides links to Rawalpindi, Jhelum, and Lahore.

Bus 
Local services also provide extensive bus routes to local towns, and smaller shuttles go around the villages in the surrounding area. There are also services to Rawalpindi, Islamabad, Jhelum, and Lahore.

Local auto-rickshaw drivers also provide transport for people in and around the city.

Notable people 
 Raja Muhammad Sarwar, first recipient of Nishan-e-Haider, the highest military award of Pakistan.
 Chaudhry Muhammad Riaz
 Mohammad Amir, cricketer
 Muhammad Javed Ikhlas Former MPA and MNA from Pakistan Muslim League (N)
 Raja Pervaiz Ashraf, Former prime minister of Pakistan
 Muhammad Hussain Janjua, first soldier to be awarded Nishan-e-Haider
 Ashfaq Parvez Kayani, Former Chief of Army Staff, Pakistan Army
 Najaf Shah, cricketer

See also
 Sangni Fort

References 

 
Gujar Khan Tehsil
Populated places in Gujar Khan Tehsil
Cities in Rawalpindi District